Helen Grayco (September 20, 1924 – August 20, 2022) was an American singer and actress active from the 1930s to the 1960s. She was most famous for appearances with her husband Spike Jones on The Spike Jones Show in the 1950s and the 1960s. She is also the mother of producer and Emmy recipient, Spike Jones, Jr. and Leslie Ann Jones, a Grammy award-winning recording engineer.

Early life
Grayco was born Helen Greco on September 20, 1924, in Tacoma, Washington, the second youngest of 11 children born to Charles Battiste Greco and his wife, Rosina. She had five brothers; John, Ralph, George, Anthony, and James, and five sisters; Mary, Carmella, Katherina, Theresa and Elizabeth. Her parents were Italians who emigrated to the United States from Lamezia Terme, Calabria. The siblings were raised in the Roman Catholic faith of their parents. Charles Battiste Greco owned a grocery store which went bankrupt during the Great Depression.

Career
At age 4, Grayco began singing in Tacoma.

Radio
In 1932, at age eight, Grayco sang on The Carnival Hour, a variety show on radio station KHJ in Los Angeles. She was then hired to appear on a local variety program in Seattle, Washington.  Bing Crosby and his brothers, who were, like Grayco, all natives of Tacoma, heard her on the program and reportedly Crosby said that "...she sings Hollywood!" Crosby gave her a job in Hollywood and soon her family moved to Los Angeles. She earned a salary of $75 a week.

Film
In 1935, after her collaboration with Crosby ended, Grayco appeared in a non-speaking part in a scene with Allan Jones in the Metro-Goldwyn-Mayer film A Night at the Opera starring the Marx Brothers.

In 1938, Joe Pasternak of Universal Studios signed Grayco, then thirteen, to replace Deanna Durbin as Universal's leading child star. During her stay at Universal, she appeared in a small role in Durbin's film That Certain Age.

Musical career

Before Spike Jones
Before meeting Spike Jones, Grayco worked with the bands of Chuck Cascalas, Chuck Cabot, and Red Nichols.  Her big break came when she began travelling with Stan Kenton's band. She was attending high school at the time she went with Kenton on a cross-country bus tour. The tour took Grayco from Los Angeles to the Roseland Ballroom in New York City.

With Spike Jones

Grayco first met bandleader Spike Jones in 1946 while she was performing at the Hollywood Palladium. After her performance he offered her a gig with him and his band, the City Slickers.

In a 2009 interview, Grayco had this to say about her first meeting with Spike Jones:

Grayco also got a spot with Jones's Other Orchestra, which he formed in 1946. The group was known for its legitimately "pretty" music in contrast to the City Slickers, who were known for their crazy way of performing. The one outstanding recording by the Other Orchestra is "Laura", which features a serious first half (played exquisitely by the Other Orchestra) and a manic second half (played hilariously by the City Slickers). Even with the success of "Laura", the public preferred the crazy music of the Slickers to the elegant music of the Other Orchestra. The Other Orchestra broke up in 1947, only a year after its founding.

She appeared with Jones and his City Slickers on The Colgate Comedy Hour and The Red Skelton Show. She also starred with Jones and his band on a series of television shows between 1954 and 1961 on NBC and CBS known as The Spike Jones Show and Club Oasis.

Solo artist
Grayco released her first single in 1949. Her two most memorable albums were After Midnight in 1957 and The Lady in Red in 1958. The latter was the last album she ever released.

Later career
Grayco continued to sing in various venues for about the next ten years. Her last public appearance was in 1968 on an episode of The Dean Martin Show.

In 1961, Grayco was the spokesperson for Kahlúa coffee liqueur. Her activities included a 13-week tour promoting the product.

Personal life and death
Grayco married Spike Jones on July 18, 1949, in Beverly Hills, California. They had three children: producer Spike Jones Jr., Grammy award-winning recording engineer Leslie Ann Jones, and Gina Jones. The marriage lasted until Jones's death on May 1, 1965, from emphysema.

In 1968, she married Bill Rosen, who owned a restaurant named Gatsby's in New York City. She moved to New York with him and later moved back to Los Angeles with him when he opened a restaurant called Gatsby's in L.A. Rosen died in 2002.

Grayco died of cancer in Los Angeles on August 20, 2022, at the age of 97.

Filmography

Film
A Night at the Opera (Little girl at the piano; uncredited role) (1935)
That Certain Age (Girl) (1938)
Cha-Cha-Cha Boom! (Performer: "Lilly's Lament (to Cell 29)") (1956)

Television

References

External links
 
 
 

1924 births
2022 deaths
21st-century American women
20th-century American women singers
Actresses from Tacoma, Washington
Singers from Tacoma, Washington
American people of Italian descent
People of Calabrian descent
20th-century American actresses
American television actresses
20th-century American singers